Billy Moore is a former English boxer, who was later active as a Muay Thai fighter in Thailand.

Life
Moore grew up in poverty on a council estate in Liverpool. He explains in his book "A Prayer Before Dawn" that he often felt isolated, being told he was worthless by his "alcoholic father". He began to fall into a life of crime by age 16, stealing cars, committing burglaries and getting involved in drugs.

After getting clean with the help of a rehab program,  Moore took a trip to Thailand as a means to turn his life around, hoping to give up drugs, alcohol and burglary, and start fresh as a boxer and stunt man. He arrived in Thailand in 2005 and taught English there. While he was clean, he even worked as a stunt double for Sylvester Stallone on Rambo IV. It was when he got back into fighting there that he got wrapped back up in drugs and crime. He had started to train in Muay Thai boxing, the country's national sport. "I got involved with underground fighting and found bad company again." He became addicted to crystal meth and ya ba (a highly addictive methamphetamine).

After being convicted of a drug-related offense, he was imprisoned in Chiang Mai Central Prison and later transferred to the notorious Klong Prem Central Prison in Bangkok, Thailand. He received a 3-year sentence. On his first night in prison he was placed in a cell with a dead body. He got involved with the prisons Muay Thai training team as a way to escape the gang violence of the prison. Moore is quoted as saying "It became like family orientated, and he invited me into their gym, took care of me, sat with me, broke bread with me".

He was repatriated to the United Kingdom in 2010. Moore credits his recovery to Prisoners Abroad and Narcotics Anonymous. Moore currently lives in Liverpool, England.

Moore missed the 2018 premiere for the movie based on his book as he was jailed for burglary in the UK.

In popular culture
The 2017 film A Prayer Before Dawn was a biopic based on Moore's life on prison. Moore himself appears at the end of the film, portraying his father.

Books 
• A Prayer Before Dawn (2011)

References 

English male boxers
English Muay Thai practitioners
English memoirists
British people convicted of burglary
British people convicted of theft
Klong Prem Central Prison inmates
Living people
Year of birth missing (living people)